Thomas Harry David Arie  (9 August 1933 – 24 May 2020) was a British old age psychiatrist, described as "one of the founding fathers of old age psychiatry."

Career
Arie qualified in Oxford then underwent further training in psychiatry at the Maudsley Hospital and in social medicine at the MRC Social Medicine Unit at the London Hospital.

He set up a psychiatric unit for old people at Goodmayes Hospital in 1969. In a 1996 interview, he recalled:

He was Foundation Professor of Health Care of the Elderly at the University of Nottingham until 1995, becoming emeritus on retirement.

He served as chair of the Old Age Faculty of the Royal College of Psychiatrists, and as chair of the Geriatric Psychiatry Section of the World Psychiatric Association.

He was made a Commander of the Order of the British Empire (CBE) in the 1995 Birthday Honours, for "Services to Medicine".

References

External links 
 Tom Arie obituary by Penny Warren for The Guardian
 Tom Arie obituary in the British Medical Journal
 Recollections of Tom Arie by John Gladman for the British Geriatric Society
 Discussion of Tom Arie on BBC Radio 4 Last Word programme

1933 births
2020 deaths
Commanders of the Order of the British Empire
Fellows of the Royal College of Psychiatrists
Fellows of the Royal College of Physicians
People educated at Reading School
Alumni of Balliol College, Oxford
Academics of the University of Nottingham